Sandra Anne Carr (born 1971) was elected to the Western Australian Legislative Council as a Labor Party member for Agricultural region at the 2021 state election.

Carr was a teacher in Geraldton prior to getting elected.

References 

1971 births
Living people
Members of the Western Australian Legislative Council
Place of birth missing (living people)
Australian Labor Party members of the Parliament of Western Australia
21st-century Australian politicians
Women members of the Western Australian Legislative Council
21st-century Australian women politicians